Hyperolius thomensis is a species of frog in the family Hyperoliidae. It is endemic to the island of São Tomé in São Tomé and Príncipe. Common names São Tomé reed frog, São Tomé giant reed frog, and Sao Tome giant treefrog have been coined for it. It is the largest Hyperolius species.

Taxonomy and systematics
The species was named by José Vicente Barbosa du Bocage in 1886. It is the type species of the genus Nesionixalus Perret, 1976. Its sister taxon Hyperolius molleri has also been placed in Nesionixalus. Together, these two species form a clade, but its recognition as a genus would render rest of Hyperolius paraphyletic. The two species can form hybrids.

Description
Adult males measure  and adult females  in snout–vent length. The dorsum is uniform brown or green to blue-green. The venter is marbled in white, orange and black. The ventral surfaces of the limbs are richly marbled in orange and black. Males have their dorsum densely beset with small spines. The pupil is horizontal.

Habitat and conservation
Breeding takes place in tree holes where their tadpoles develop, and the same hole can be utilized by many individuals.

The threats to this species are poorly known, but it is probably impacted by habitat loss caused by agriculture, livestock, wood extraction, and human settlements. Its range includes the Parque Natural Obô de São Tomé.

References

Further reading
Bocage, 1866 Reptiles et bataciens nouveaux de lIe de St. Thomé. Jornal de sciencias mathematicas, physicas e naturaes', Lisbon, vol. 11, p. 71-75

thomensis
Frogs of Africa
Endemic vertebrates of São Tomé and Príncipe
Fauna of São Tomé Island
Amphibians described in 1886
Taxa named by José Vicente Barbosa du Bocage
Taxonomy articles created by Polbot